is a Japanese pair skater who now works as an ISU Technical Specialist. Competing with Rena Inoue, he placed 14th in the 1992 Winter Olympic Games. They are two-time Japanese National Champions. He also competed as a single skater.

Competitive highlights

Men's singles

Pairs with Inoue

References
Profile

External links
Japan Figure Skating Instructor Association

1971 births
Living people
Japanese male pair skaters
Olympic figure skaters of Japan
Figure skaters at the 1992 Winter Olympics
International Skating Union technical specialists